Rajya Sabha elections were held on various dates in 1999, to elect members of the Rajya Sabha, Indian Parliament's upper chamber. 1 member from Goa, 3 members from Gujarat and 6 members from West Bengal were elected.

Elections
Elections were held to elect members from various states.

Members elected
The following members are elected in the elections held in 1999. They are members for the term 1999–2005 and retire in year 2005, except in case of the resignation or death before the term.
The list is incomplete.

State - Member - Party

Bye-elections
The following bye elections were held in the year 1999.

State - Member - Party

 Bye-elections were held on 30.08.1999 for vacancy from Assam due to death of seating member Parag Chaliha on 22 June 1999 with term ending on 14 June 2001   Joyasree Goswami Mahanta  of AGP became the member on 24/08/1999.

References

1999 elections in India
1999